Lakewood Village is the name of some places in the United States:

 Lakewood Village, Texas
 Lakewood Village, Long Beach, California